The Poet of Tolstoy Park is the 2005 debut novel of Sonny Brewer, published by Ballantine. The novel, inspired by the life of Henry Stuart, who moved from Idaho to Alabama in the 1920s after being told incorrectly that he had a year to live, has made Stuart's Alabama home a site of pilgrimage for its readers. The book has been optioned for a film and as of 2007 was in pre-production.

Plot
The book begins in Nampa, Idaho, with Henry Stuart having just learned that he has one to two years to live because he has non-contagious tuberculosis. Told he will be more comfortable in a warmer climate, Stuart leaves his two grown sons to relocate to Fairhope, Alabama. When he arrives, he finds that the land he has purchased sight unseen hosts only a barn. He decides to build a house, on property he names "Tolstoy Park" in honor of Leo Tolstoy, who had himself become a wandering ascetic in the months before his death. An amateur poet and an eccentric, Stuart sheds his materialism for a life of contemplation, one which extends much longer than Stuart expected.

Background
When Sonny Brewer, then a real estate agent, saw a small, round concrete hut sitting adjacent to a parking lot in Fairhope, Alabama in the 1980s, he became curious to know who had built it and why. Several old newspaper articles filled him in on the history of Henry Stuart, an Idahoan who was informed by his doctors in the early 1920s that he had only a year to live. The shelter, which was built in about two weeks more than a year in 1925 and 1926, was set  into the ground on which it was constructed, lending to a comfortable, stable temperature of the floor—the  diameter of which was a perfect match to the highest point of the roof. Brewer was fascinated by the story of the eccentric Stuart, who lived in his hut for 18 years convinced he was on the brink of death before relocating, finally dying in Oregon in 1946 at the age of 88.

Brewer was on the verge of bankruptcy when he learned Ballentine had purchased his novel about Stuart's life, only 20 pages of which were complete, for $100,000.00. He rented and set about restoring the hut while writing the novel, moving into it to live—like Stuart—barefoot during its revision.

Aftermath

Even during Stuart's occupancy, the hut was often visited. Stuart, otherwise a hermit, kept a logbook signed by 1,200 guests, including Clarence Darrow. After the book was published, its readers began visiting the hut as well, with 2,000 people in one year signing the logbook left by Brewer, some spending the night inside. In 2006, the hut was listed on the National Register of Historic Places.

The novel has been optioned for a film and as of 2007 was in pre-production. The film is being produced by David Bushell, producer of Slingblade and Eternal Sunshine of the Spotless Mind, with a screenplay adapted by Tom Epperson in collaboration with Brewer.

Further reading
Book review, Kirkus Reviews 
Book review, Library Journal
Book review, Publishers Weekly

References

External links
Interview with the author about the book, WBHM
Author's website, including photographs of Stuart and Tolstoy Park

Biographical novels
2005 American novels
Novels set in Idaho
Novels set in Alabama
Fairhope, Alabama
2005 debut novels